Teodora Rumenova Andreeva (born 23 January 1987), better known by her stage name Andrea, is a Bulgarian pop-folk singer, songwriter and video director. She was also part of the famous group Sahara, together with the Romanian Grammy Awards nominated producer Costi Ioniță they created the song "I Wanna" in collaboration with Shaggy and Bob Sinclar. The song was distributed by Yellow Productions and Ministry of Sound Australia. The track was on the top charts of Belgium, Germany and Switzerland.

Biography and lifestyle 
Andrea was born in Sofia. She took music lessons at an early age from her aunt who was an opera singer in the Vratsa Opera. During her teenage years she entered and won several beauty pageants (Miss Sofia, Miss Tourism Bulgaria).

After graduating high school, she signed with Bulgarian record label Payner.

In 2008, Andrea met Costi Ioniță and together they produced the track "". During the next year, they created the duo Sahara. Their next hit song "Tyalee" was released in 2009 and featured the artist Lenox Brown. The song was released worldwide and known abroad by the name "Tyalee", but by the name "" in Bulgaria. The English version of the song was produced by Cat Music and soon after Serdar Ortaç released a Turkish version with Sahara.

Sahara released another single called "" with Buppy and Geo Da Silva. "" and its Bulgarian version "" was released in Romania, Bulgaria, Italy and France.

In 2010, Andrea released "" and "".

Andrea and Costi then went to Miami to work on a new track, "I Wanna", performed with Bob Sinclar and Shaggy. "I Wanna" was released in 2010 in over 50 countries.

The next Sahara song was called "Mine" featuring American R&B singer Mario Winans.

She was a TV show host for 3 months on UTV Romania.

She followed up with the track "Champagne", featuring previous collaborator Shaggy.

In May 2012, she joined the biggest music company in Romania, Roton Music, where she released "Only You" in a duet with Gabriel Davi and a solo track "Hayati", produced by Adrian Sînă of Akcent.

Andrea appeared on the cover of the Italian fashion magazine Donna Salon International.

In 2014, Andrea released her song with Alek Sandar "Peaceful Place" in which both of them express their support for the LGBT community and their opposition towards discrimination on the basis of sexual orientation. CNN also mentioned Andrea's duet with Alek Sandar on Planeta TV Awards.

Discography

Studio albums 
  (2008)
  (2009)
  (2010)
  (2012)

References

External links 
Official website

1987 births
Living people
Bulgarian folk-pop singers
English-language singers from Bulgaria
Bulgarian female models
Musicians from Sofia
Bulgarian LGBT rights activists
Bulgarian expatriates in Romania
Glamour models
21st-century Bulgarian women singers